Edward Cooke (died 1683) was an English politician who sat in the House of Commons  in 1659.

Cooke was the son of Sir Robert Cooke. He was a colonel of horse in the Parliamentary army.

In 1659, Cooke was elected Member of Parliament for Tewkesbury in the Third Protectorate Parliament.

Cooke died in 1683 without issue.

References

Year of birth missing
1683 deaths
English MPs 1659
Roundheads
Politicians from Gloucestershire